The Minister for Skills and Training is a position currently held by Brendan O'Connor in the Albanese ministry since 1 June 2022, following the Australian federal election in 2022.

In the Government of Australia, the minister administers this portfolio through the Department of Employment and Workplace Relations.

List of Ministers for Skills and Training
The following individuals have been appointed as Minister for Skills and Training, or any of its precedent titles:

List of assistant ministers
The following individuals have been appointed as Assistant Minister for Vocational Education and Skills, or any of its precedent titles:

References

External links
 

Skills and Training
Employment in Australia